A special election was held to fill the remainder of the term in the United States House of Representatives for  in the 116th United States Congress. Incumbent Republican Representative Chris Collins resigned from the House effective October 1, 2019, following his guilty plea to federal insider trading charges. The election was originally scheduled for April 28, 2020, but was postponed until June 23, 2020, due to the COVID-19 pandemic.

Candidates
Former Grand Island town supervisor and 2018 Democratic congressional nominee Nathan D. McMurray was expected to be the nominee after being endorsed by the Erie County Democratic Party. Fellow Democrat Melodie Baker announced her interest in seeking the nomination, but quickly withdrew when her campaign failed to gain interest. McMurray was formally nominated on February 13, 2020.

On January 25, 2020, the Republican chairs of the eight counties that make up the 27th congressional district met in Wyoming County and voted to endorse state senator Chris Jacobs for the special election.

On February 1, 2020, the Conservative Party of New York State announced that it would not endorse a candidate in the anticipated special election and would instead leave its party line blank. The Party's preferred candidate was Beth Parlato.

Accountant Duane Whitmer was endorsed by the Libertarian Party.

Republican Party

Endorsee
Chris Jacobs, state senator for New York's 60th State Senate district

Withdrawn 

 Rob Ortt, state senator for New York's 62nd State Senate district
Frank C. Smierciak II, health care firm employee (running for New York State Assembly instead)

Declined to run
David Bellavia, U.S. Army veteran and Medal of Honor recipient
Steve Hawley, state assemblyman for New York's 139th State Assembly district

Endorsements

Democratic Party

Endorsee
Nate McMurray, former Grand Island supervisor and nominee for New York's 27th congressional district in 2018

Withdrawn
Melodie Baker, former director of education for the United Way of Buffalo and small business owner

Declined to run
Kathy Hochul, Lieutenant Governor of New York and former U.S. Representative for New York's 26th congressional district (2011–2013)

Libertarian Party

Endorsee
Duane Whitmer, Erie County Libertarian Party chairman

Green Party

Endorsee
Mike Gamms, Comedian and Activist
Per a Facebook Messenger comment from Erie County Greens: "We did endorse him, but the endorsement was withdrawn after he made several posts on social media that many felt were problematic. He is still on the ballot as a Green because there is no way to remove him, but the State Party has stopped assisting/promoting his campaign."

General election

Debate
McMurray and Jacobs participated in a debate on June 9, in which McMurray criticized Jacobs for not standing up to Trump's actions, in particular, Trump's claim that a 75-year-old man injured by police in Buffalo could be an "ANTIFA provocateur". McMurray also accused Jacobs of trying to buy the position, lying, and not supporting the Black Lives Matter movement. He emphasized his continued positive impact on communities in the area, positioning himself as an alternative to former Republican representatives Chris Collins and Chris Lee, both of whom resigned due to scandals. Jacobs criticized McMurray for supporting big government and abortion, which he saw as a poor fit for the conservative values of the district.

Predictions

Results

See also 
 2020 New York state elections

References

External links
Official campaign websites
 Chris Jacobs (R) for Congress
 Nate McMurray (D) for Congress
 Duane Whitmer (L) for Congress

New York 2020 27
New York 2020 27
2020 27 Special
New York 27 Special
United States House of Representatives 27 Special
United States House of Representatives 2020 27